The 1908–09 season saw Rochdale compete in the Lancashire Combination Division 2 where they finished in 10th place out of 20. They also competed in the F.A. Cup for the first time, in the preliminary round.

Statistics
		

 
|}

Competitions

Lancashire Combination Division 2

F.A. Cup

Lancashire Junior Cup

Friendlies

References

Rochdale A.F.C. seasons
Rochdale